Oostburg School District is a public school district in Oostburg, Wisconsin that serves that village and the town of Holland in Sheboygan County.

Schools 
 Oostburg Elementary School
 Oostburg Middle School
 Oostburg High School

External links 
 Oostburg School District

School districts in Wisconsin
Education in Sheboygan County, Wisconsin